Fudbalski klub Sarajevo is a professional football club based in Sarajevo, Bosnia and Herzegovina, which plays in the Premier League of Bosnia and Herzegovina. This chronological list comprises all those who have held the position of club manager since the club's formation in 1946.

In Sarajevo's history, 46 managers have so far managed the club, with some doing so on more than one occasion. The club's first manager was Josip Bulat, who led the team from 1 November 1946 to May 1947. The longest serving manager was Fuad Muzurović, who managed the club from December 1990 to November 1995. The current club manager is Mirza Varešanović. Husref Musemić is the only manager in Sarajevo history than has won two or more national championships with the club. He is the most successful manager in the club's history as well.

Managers
The following is a list of Sarajevo managers and their respective tenures on the bench:

 Josip Bulat (1 November 1946 – May 1947)
 Slavko Zagorac (1947–1948)
 Miroslav Brozović (September 1948 – August 1952)
 Slavko Zagorac (1952–1953)
 Aleksandar Tomašević (1953)
 Slavko Zagorac (1953)
 Miroslav Brozović (1954–1956)
 Slavko Zagorac (1956)
 Aleksandar Tomašević (1956–1958)
 László Fenyvesi (1958)
 Vojin Božović (1958–1959)
 Miroslav Brozović (1959–1961)
 Ratomir Čabrić (1961–1963)
 Abdulah Gegić (1963–1965)
 Aleksandar Atanacković (1965–1966)
 Miroslav Brozović (1966–1967)
 Franjo Lovrić (1967)
 Munib Saračević (1967–1969)
 Miroslav Brozović (1969–1970)
 Srboljub Markušević (1970–1971)
 Abdulah Gegić (1971–1972)
 Srboljub Markušević (1972–1973)
 Svetozar Vujović (1973–1974)
 Mirsad Fazlagić (1974–1975)
 Vukašin Višnjevac (1975–1977)
 Fuad Muzurović (1 July 1977 – 1 September 1981)
 Srboljub Markušević (1981–1983)
 Boško Antić (1983–1986)
 Denijal Pirić (1986–1988)
 Džemaludin Mušović (1988–1990)
 Rajko Rašević (1990)
 Srboljub Markušević (1990)
  Fuad Muzurović (December 1990 – November 1995)
 Denijal Pirić (November 1995 – October 1996)
 Nermin Hadžiahmetović (October 1996 – July 1997)
 Mehmed Janjoš (July 1997 – July 1998)
 Nermin Hadžiahmetović (1998–1999)
 Sead Jesenković (1999)
 Agim Nikolić (1999)
 Denijal Pirić (2000–2001)
 Husref Musemić (January 2001 – June 2001)
 Fuad Muzurović (July 2001 – June 2002)
 Husref Musemić (2002–2003)
 Agim Nikolić (2003–2004)
 Kemal Alispahić (July 2004 – September 2004)
 Edin Prljača (September 2004 – December 2004)
 Husref Musemić (January 2005 – June 2008)
 Šener Bajramović (June 2008 – October 2008)
 Husnija Arapović (October 2008 – December 2008)
 Mehmed Janjoš (December 2008 – February 2010)
 Mirza Varešanović (April 2010 – June 2011)
 Jiří Plíšek (July 2011 – December 2011)
 Dragan Jović (January 2012 – March 2013)
 Husref Musemić (March 2013 – December 2013)
 Robert Jarni (December 2013 – April 2014)
 Dženan Uščuplić (April 2014 – 26 September 2014)
 Meho Kodro (30 September 2014 – 21 April 2015)
 Dženan Uščuplić (21 April 2015 – 11 September 2015)
 Almir Hurtić (interim) (11 September 2015 – 23 September 2015)
 Miodrag Ješić (23 September 2015 – 16 March 2016)
 Almir Hurtić (16 March 2016 – 23 August 2016)
 Mehmed Janjoš (29 August 2016 – 23 July 2017)
 Senad Repuh (23 July 2017 – 22 August 2017)
 Husref Musemić (26 August 2017 – 2 December 2019)
 Vinko Marinović (30 December 2019 – 12 May 2021)
 Dženan Uščuplić (interim) (13 May 2021 – 31 May 2021)
 Goran Sablić (12 June 2021 – 27 December 2021)
 Aleksandar Vasoski (10 January 2022 – 10 May 2022)
 Dženan Uščuplić (interim) (12 May 2022 – 1 June 2022)
 Feđa Dudić (2 June 2022 – 19 October 2022)
 Emir Obuća (interim) (20 October 2022 – 12 December 2022)
 Mirza Varešanović (12 December 2022 – present)

References

External links

Official Website 
FK Sarajevo at Facebook
FK Sarajevo at Twitter
FK Sarajevo at UEFA
FKSinfo 

Records
Sarajevo
FK Sar
Lists of Bosnia and Herzegovina sportspeople